Shimoji is a Japanese surname. Notable people with the surname include:

, Japanese basketball coach
, Japanese politician
, Japanese voice actress and singer
, Japanese footballer

Japanese-language surnames